is a Japanese Egyptologist. He currently is Director of the Institute of Egyptology, Waseda University, Tokyo.

He is the first president of an online college Cyber University.

Publications
Non-destructive pyramid investigation, 1987

References

1943 births
Living people
Japanese Egyptologists
Waseda University alumni
Academic staff of Waseda University